Paduka Sri Sultan Ibrahim Shah Zilu'llah fil'Alam Khalifat ul-Muminin ibni al-Marhum Yam Tuan Muda Raja Bajau was the Sultan of Johor from House of Melaka who reigned from 1677 to 1685. He was the only known son of Yamtuan Muda of Pahang, Raja Bajau and succeeded on the death of his cousin, Abdul Jalil Shah III as sultan of Johor-Pahang-Riau-Lingga.

In 1678, Laksamana Tun Abdul Jamil persuaded Ibrahim Shah to move the capital of the empire to Riau in order to effectively suppress Jambi forces, who years earlier successfully sacked the old capital of Batu Sawar. Jambi was finally subdued in 1679. In 1681, Johor forces assisted Jambi, now its vassal, in defeating Palembang and its Bugis allies.

Although Ibrahim Shah wanted to return to Johor Lama towards the end of his reign, he was persuaded against this by the family of Laksamana Tun Abdul Jamil, who grew very powerful in the mainland while the Sultan was away in Riau.

Ibrahim Shah died at Riau on 16 February 1685, poisoned by three of his wives, having had issue one son by his third wife, who succeeded as Mahmud Shah II.

References

Bibliography
 

Sultans of Johor
1685 deaths
17th-century Sultans of Pahang
Deaths by poisoning
17th-century murdered monarchs